Rich Draheim (born April 27, 1969) is an American politician and member of the Minnesota Senate. A member of the Republican Party of Minnesota, he represents District 20 in south-central Minnesota.

Early life, education, and career
Draheim graduated from Minnesota State University, Mankato with a Bachelor of Science in 1994. He previously owned the Westwood Marina in Kasota. He currently owns Weichert Realtors in Mankato and the New Ulm Event Center.

Minnesota Senate
Draheim was elected to the Minnesota Senate in 2016.

Personal life
Draheim and his wife, Lynnette, have two children and reside in Madison Lake.

References

External links

 Official Senate website
 Official campaign website

Living people
Businesspeople from Minnesota
Republican Party Minnesota state senators
21st-century American politicians
Minnesota State University, Mankato alumni
People from Blue Earth County, Minnesota
1969 births